The Church St. Archangel Michael, Kumanovo (Macedonian Cyrillic: Црква Свети Архангел Михаил, Куманово)  is an Eastern Orthodox church under construction  in the Karposh neighborhood in Kumanovo, North Macedonia.

See also
 Kumanovo

References

Churches in Kumanovo
Macedonian Orthodox churches